Martine Aurillac (born 28 April 1939) is a French politician who was a member of the National Assembly of France. She represented the city of Paris, and is a member of the Union for a Popular Movement.

References

External links
Official website

1939 births
Living people
Union for a Popular Movement politicians
Women members of the National Assembly (France)
Women mayors of places in France
Deputies of the 12th National Assembly of the French Fifth Republic
Deputies of the 13th National Assembly of the French Fifth Republic
21st-century French women politicians